Thought You Should Know may refer to:

"Thought You Should Know" (Keyshia Cole song)
"Thought You Should Know" (Morgan Wallen song)

See also
You Should Know